This is a list of all cricketers who have played first-class or List A matches for Pakistan Telecommunication Company Limited cricket team. The team played nineteen first-class matches and fourteen List A matches between 2003 and 2006. Seasons given are first and last seasons; the player did not necessarily play in all the intervening seasons.

Players
 Aamer Bashir, 2004/05-2005/06
 Adnan Naved, 2003/04-2004/05
 Ameer Khan, 2001/02-2003/04
 Aqeel Arshad, 2004/05
 Aqeel Mukhtar, 2001/02-2003/04
 Ashar Zaidi, 2001/02-2005/06
 Asim Kamal, 2002/03-2005/06
 Babar Naeem, 2002/03-2005/06
 Irfan Haider, 2001/02-2004/05
 Jawad Hameed, 2001/02-2005/06
 Mohammad Boota, 2004/05-2005/06
 Mohammad Fayyaz, 2003/04-2005/06
 Mohammad Hussain, 2002/03-2005/06
 Mohammad Khalil, 2002/03-2005/06
 Nauman Habib, 2003/04
 Naved Latif, 2003/04-2004/05
 Riaz Afridi, 2002/03-2005/06
 Shahid Hameed, 2005/06
 Shehzad Malik, 2003/04-2005/06
 Sheraz Khalid, 2003/04-2004/05
 Tabish Nawab, 2003/04-2004/05
 Tahir Mughal, 2005/06
 Usman Ali, 2004/05
 Usman Tariq, 2005/06
 Waqar Ahmed, 2003/04-2005/06
 Yasin Bari, 2001/02-2005/06
 Yasir Ali, 2004/05
 Zulqarnain Haider, 2001/02-2005/06

References

Pakistan Telecommunication Company Limited cricketers